Madhya Pradesh State Highway 13 (MP SH 13) is a State Highway running from Sundara via Singpur, Kothi, Birsingpur till Semaria town. It is alternatively known as Birsinghpur Main Road.

It connects the districts of Panna, Satna, Rewa of Madhya Pradesh covering a total distance of 86 kilometers.

In 2017, SH 13 was defined.

Further reading

See also
List of state highways in Madhya Pradesh

References

State Highways in Madhya Pradesh